My Love (1945–after 1962) was a French Thoroughbred racehorse and sire. In a career that lasted from 1947 to 1948 he ran eight times and won three races. In the summer of 1948 he became the third French-trained horse to win The Derby and the fifth horse to win both the Derby and the Grand Prix de Paris. At the end of the season he was retired to stud but he had little success before or after being exported to Argentina in 1951.

Background
My Love was bred in France by his original owner Leon Volterra, who later sold a half share in the colt to the Aga Khan.  The colt was trained at Chantilly by Richard “Dick” Carver an Englishman whose family had been based in France for many years. Carver had never been to Epsom before My Love ran in the 1948 Derby.

My Love’s sire, Vatellor was a high class racehorse who won eight races in France including the race now called the Prix Jean Prat. He later became a successful stallion being Champion sire in France in 1956 and getting such notable performers as Pearl Diver, Nikellora (Prix de l'Arc de Triomphe) and Vattel (Grand Prix de Paris). My Love’s dam, For My Love was bred by Volterra and won two small races, but produced no other horses of importance.

Racing career

1947: two-year-old season
My Love provided little evidence of potential as a two-year-old in 1948. He ran twice without winning, although he was beaten only a head on his debut.

1948: three-year-old season
In the spring of 1948, My Love ran in the major French middle-distance trial races (Poules des Produits). In April he finished second to Flush Royal in the Prix Noailles over 2200m at Longchamp and then finished third to Rigolo and Flush Royal in the Prix Greffulhe. At this point in the season, My Love was not considered a serious Derby contender and was available at odds of 100/1. On his next start on May 9 he was moved up in distance for the Prix Hocquart over 2400m and showed improved form, winning in "brilliant" style from Turmoil and Flush Royal. Shortly after the race the Aga Khan, reportedly acting on the advice of  My Love’s Australian jockey Rae Johnstone, bought a half share in the colt for £15,000.

At Epsom My Love started at 100/9 (approximately 11/1) in a  field of thirty-two runners, the largest since 1862. The 2000 Guineas winner My Babu started favourite at 7/2, in front of a crowd estimated at up to 1,000,000 which included the King and the Prime Minister.  My Love was held up at the back of the field by Rae Johnstone in the early stages as Tory II  made the running. Turning into the straight the French-trained Royal Drake overtook the leader and went clear. Johnstone switched My Love to the outside and the colt produced what was described as a "brilliant burst of speed" to catch Royal Drake well inside the final furlong and win  by one and a half lengths with Noor four lengths further back in third. The second and third placed horses were owned by Volterra and the Aga Khan respectively.

At the end of June My Love returned to Longchamp for the Grand Prix de Paris, at that time the most valuable race in France ($16,800), for which he was made 2/1 favourite. As at Epsom, he was held up at the rear of the field in the early running before making a "terrific run" in the straight. He became the first horse since Spearmint in 1906 to complete the Derby-Grand Prix double, beating Flush Royal by a length with the Prix du Jockey Club winner Bey in third. In September attempted to complete a unique treble by adding the St Leger at Doncaster. He was strongly fancied in the build-up to the race, with Noor and the improving American-bred Black Tarquin being seen as his most serious rivals. My Love started favourite for a race which, with a prize of £15,368, was the most valuable ever run in Britain but finished unplaced behind Black Tarquin and Alycidon. My Love was then retired to stud.

Assessment
In their book A Century of Champions, John Randall and Tony Morris rated My Love an “average” Derby winner.

Stud career
My Love was based in France for his first three seasons at stud, but the foals he sired in Europe made little impact. He was sold to the Argentinian government in 1951, exported and auctioned in Buenos Aires where he fetched a sum of £46,250. The date of My Love’s death is not recorded, but his last foals would appear to have been conceived in either 1962 or 1963.

Pedigree

My Love was inbred 3x4 to Teddy. This means that the stallion appears in both the third and fourth generations of his pedigree.

References

External links
Newsreel of 1948 Derby from British Pathe

1945 racehorse births
Racehorses bred in France
Racehorses trained in the United Kingdom
Epsom Derby winners
Thoroughbred family 7-b